Microseris elegans is a species of flowering plant in the family Asteraceae known by the common name elegant silverpuffs. It is native to California and Baja California, where it grows in the valleys, foothills, and coastal mountain ranges. Its habitat includes grassland, sometimes near vernal pools, and especially clay soils.

Description 
It is an annual herb growing up to 35 centimeters tall from a basal rosette of erect leaves; there is no true stem. Each leaf is up to 20 centimeters long and has edges which are smooth, toothed, or divided into many lobes. The inflorescence is borne on an erect or curving peduncle arising from ground level. The flower head contains up to 100 orange or yellow ray florets.

The fruit is an achene with a brown to nearly black body a few millimeters long. At the tip of the body is a large pappus made up of five long, flat, barbed scales.

External links
Jepson Manual Treatment — Microseris elegans
USDA Plants Profile: Microseris elegans
Flora of North America
Microseris elegans — Photo gallery

elegans
Flora of California
Flora of Baja California
Flora of the Sierra Nevada (United States)
Natural history of the California chaparral and woodlands
Natural history of the California Coast Ranges
Natural history of the Central Valley (California)
Natural history of the Channel Islands of California
Taxa named by Asa Gray
Flora without expected TNC conservation status